Azazeel is a novel by Youssef Ziedan, published by "Dar Al-Shorouk" in 2008. Its events take place in the fifth century AD between Upper Egypt, Alexandria and northern Syria, following the adoption of Christianity by the Roman Empire, and the ensuing internal sectarian conflict between the church fathers on the one hand, and the new believers on the other hand, declining paganism. The novel won the International Prize for Arabic Fiction in 2009.

Controversy 
The novel caused controversy because it dealt with ancient Christian theological disputes over the nature of Christ and the status of the Virgin, and the persecution that Christians practiced against Egyptian pagans in the periods when Christianity became the religion of the Egyptian majority.

The novel is based on the travels of an Egyptian monk in the fourth century AD. The Coptic Orthodox Church accused the novel of defaming Christianity and inciting sectarian strife between Islamic and Christianity in Egypt.

Awards 
 Winner 2009, The International Prize for Arabic Fiction (IPAF)

References

2008 novels
Arabic-language novels
Novels set in the 5th century
Novels set in Egypt
Novels set in Syria